Darwin Ralph Nealey (July 5, 1919 – January 21, 2002) was an American politician in the state of Washington. He served in the Washington House of Representatives from 1983 to 1993 for district 9.

Career 
Nealey was a farmer in Washington.

On November 2, 1982, Nealey won the election and became a Republican member of Washington House of Representatives for District 9, Position 1. Nealey defeated Jim Timmons with 50.94% of the votes.
On November 6, 1984, as an incumbent, Nealey won the election and continued serving as a member of Washington House of Representatives District 9, Position 1. Nealey defeated Jim Timmons with 56.29% of the votes.
On November 4, 1986, as an incumbent, Nealey won the election and continued serving as a member of Washington House of Representatives District 9, Position 1. Nealey defeated Ken Casavant with 51.94% of the votes.
On November 8, 1988, as an incumbent, Nealey won the election and continued serving as a member of Washington House of Representatives District 9, Position 1. Nealey defeated Victor Moore with 59.98% of the votes.
On November 6, 1990, as an incumbent, Nealey won the election and continued serving as a member of Washington House of Representatives District 9, Position 1. Nealey defeated Victor Moore with 51.17% of the votes.

Personal life 
Nealey's second wife was Evelyn Moland Nealey (died 2008). Nealey had 2 sons, a daughter, and 2 step-sons from Evelyn. Nealey and his family live in LaCrosse, Washington.

On Jan. 21, 2002, Nealey died from a heart attack at his home in LaCrosse, Washington.

References

External links 
 Darwin Nealey at ourcampaigns.com
 Darwin R. Nealey at wa.gov (1983)

2002 deaths
1919 births
Republican Party members of the Washington House of Representatives
20th-century American politicians